Hélder Silva (born 2 August 1987) is a Portuguese canoeist. He competed in the men's C-1 200 metres event at the 2016 Summer Olympics.

References

External links
 

1987 births
Living people
Portuguese male canoeists
Olympic canoeists of Portugal
Canoeists at the 2016 Summer Olympics
European Games competitors for Portugal
Canoeists at the 2015 European Games
Canoeists at the 2019 European Games
Sportspeople from Braga